Zasagt Khan, born Tümen, (1539–1592) was a khagan of the Northern Yuan dynasty, reigning from 1558 to 1592. He was the successor of Darayisung Gödeng Khan and had direct rule over the Chahar. It was during his rule that the Mongols conquered the Daur and Evenk tribes. Unlike his father, he succeeded in uniting the entirety of the Mongol peoples, including the Western Mongols, with little bloodshed.

Tümen, who was born in 1539, was the first of three sons of Darayisung Gödeng Khan. By being recognized as Khagan, Altan validated his authority. However, coordinating Altan Khan's actions, Tümen won over Uriyangkhai and Daur Mongols. His relatives, Abtai Khan and Khutughtai Sechen Khung Taiji, brought a large portion of the Four Oirats back into the Mongol fold. In addition to his successful invasions of the Ming dynasty, Tümen conquered Koko Nur and appointed his son ruler there.

Tümen and other Mongol princes decided to adopt Tibetan Buddhism. In 1576, Tümen was converted by Ilduni Sanggiduktshi Garma Lama into Buddhism. He assembled the Six Tumens, and codified laws. He made reforms on state laws and exempted the Mongol nobles from some taxes. He compiled a new code that was supposed to be based on Yekhe Zasag of Genghis Khan. Thenceforwards he was called Jasagtu, who made peace with the Right Wing Tumens and gave their leaders official titles. He compelled the three Jurchen tribes such as Jurjis in Manchuria and Yekhe Tungusians, to pay tribute.

Zasaghtu Khan died in 1592.

See also
 List of khans of the Northern Yuan dynasty

References

1539 births
1592 deaths
Converts to Buddhism
Mongolian Buddhist monarchs
Northern Yuan rulers
16th-century Mongol rulers
16th-century Chinese monarchs